Lazzari is an Italian surname and may refer to the following people:

 16-17th century
Dionisio Lazzari (1617–1689), Italian sculptor and architect
Giorgio Lazzari (1564–1615), Italian Catholic Bishop of Minori 
Tiburzio Lazzari, Venerable (1592-1625), a soldier who vowed to fight only enemies of the Catholic faith

 19-20th century
Andrea Lazzari (born 1984), Italian footballer
Bice Lazzari (1900–1981), Italian painter
Carla Lazzari, better known as simply Carla (born 2005), French singer
Chad Allen Lazzari (born 1974), retired American actor
Costantino Lazzari (1857–1927), Italian politician
Daniele Lazzari (born 1997), Italian footballer
Emilio Lazzari (1823–1902), Italian painter
Flavio Lazzari (born 1986), Italian footballer
Lani Lazzari (entrepreneur), American female founder of the Simple Sugars company 
Lorenzo Lazzari (footballer) (born 2003), Sammarinese footballer 
Magda Bianchi Lázzari, Guatemalan diplomat, activist, and the former First Lady of Guatemala from 1991 until 1993
Manuel Lazzari (born 1993), Italian footballer who plays as a right-sided midfielder 
Nicola Lazzari, Italian contemporary violin maker
Niccolò Lazzari, Italian film editor from the 1940s to '60s
Pietro Lazzari (1895–1979), Italian-American artist and sculptor
Roberto Lazzari (born 1937), Italian retired swimmer
Sylvio Lazzari (1857–1944), French composer
Virgilio Lazzari (1887–1953), Italian operatic bass

See also
Rodrigo De Lazzari (born 1980), Brazilian footballer of Italian descent

External links 
 Distribution of the name Lazzari in Italy

Italian-language surnames